Monaghan County Council is the authority responsible for local government in County Monaghan, Ireland. As a county council, it is governed by the Local Government Act 2001. The council is responsible for housing and community, roads and transportation, urban planning and development, amenity and culture, and environment.  The council has 18 elected members. Elections are held every five years and are by single transferable vote. The head of the council has the title of Cathaoirleach (Chairperson). The county administration is headed by a Chief Executive, Eamonn O'Sullivan. The county town is Monaghan.

History
Originally Monaghan Courthouse had been the meeting place of Monaghan County Council. The county council moved to the County Offices in Glen Road in 1981.

Local Electoral Areas and Municipal Districts
Monaghan County Council is divided into the following municipal districts and local electoral areas, defined by electoral divisions.

Councillors

2019 seats summary

Councillors by electoral area
This list reflects the order in which councillors were elected on 24 May 2019.

References

External links

Politics of County Monaghan
County councils in the Republic of Ireland